Bernard Springsteel (born 1930, Dobbs Ferry, New York) is an American artist and sculptor.

Biography 

Springsteel was born in Dobbs Ferry, New York in 1930. He graduated from the Pratt Institute in Brooklyn, New York, with a BFA in Illustration in 1953. Subsequently, he was employed in the role of art director at Good Housekeeping, McCall's and other magazines. He also acted as an illustrator and designer.

Work 

In spite of his busy career as an art director in New York City, Springsteel painted in both oils and watercolors and also created sculptures on weekends and during vacations. His artistic works are centered on historic homes, barns, windmills and other structures as well as watercraft. Much of his work was created on the North and South Forks of Eastern Long Island where he vacationed with his family for many years and later resided. Since his retirement, Springsteel has devoted himself to watercolor painting and sculpture.

Springsteel is the author of three books - Carpentry & Rough Wood, Bernard Herbert Springsteel, A Life in Art and The Figure of Life.

He also built several wooden boats, numerous small wooden structures including sheds and bridges, and some furniture. Some of these works are featured in his book, Carpentry & Rough Wood.

Springsteel's work has been featured in numerous art galleries in the Northeast. Examples of his work can be found in the permanent collections of the Pratt Institute, the Brooklyn Historical Society and the Bridgehampton Museum.

Springsteel formerly operated the Springsteel Art Gallery in Greenport, New York. In recognition of his artistic talent, Springsteel was elected to New York City's Prestigious Salmagundi Club, "one of the oldest art organizations in the United States", whose members have included such well-known artists as N. C. Wyeth, William Merritt Chase and Childe Hassam.

References

External links 

Springsteel Gallery, artist's official website
Salmagundi Club member profile for Bernard Springsteel

1930 births
Living people
People from Dobbs Ferry, New York
Pratt Institute alumni
Sculptors from New York (state)